Villarpedre is one of seven parishes (administrative divisions) in the municipality of Grandas de Salime, within the province and autonomous community of Asturias, in northern Spain. 

The population is 6 (INE 2006).

References

Parishes in Grandas de Salime